John Trezise Tonkin AC (2 February 1902 – 20 October 1995), popularly known as "Honest John", was an Australian politician.

A member of the Labor Party, he served as a Member of the Western Australian Legislative Assembly for a record 44 years from 1933 to 1977, and was the 20th Premier of Western Australia, serving from the 1971 election, where his party defeated the ruling Liberal–Country coalition led by David Brand, to the 1974 election, where the Labor Party was defeated by the Liberal–Country coalition led by Charles Court. A number of landmarks were later named or renamed after him, including the Tonkin Highway and John Tonkin College in Mandurah.

Biography
John Tonkin was born in Boulder, Western Australia, on 2 February 1902. He was the son of John Trezise Tonkin and Julia Carrigan. Of Cornish descent, he attended Boulder City Central School and Eastern Goldfields High School, and began working as a schoolteacher, teaching in several schools in country Western Australia. By 1923, he was teaching at Forest Grove, near Witchcliffe in the South West, where he established a branch of the Labor Party (ALP). He married Rosalie Cleghorn on 29 December 1926 at St. Mary's Church in West Perth.

At the 1933 state election, Tonkin was elected to the seat of North-East Fremantle, with the ALP, led by Philip Collier, winning 30 out of the 50 seats available. His campaign manager for the 1933 election was Jerry Dolan. In May 1935, he received the Silver Jubilee Medal of King George V.

In December 1943, Tonkin was made Minister for Education, succeeding William Kitson, a position which he held until the 1947 election. He had previously served as Minister for Agriculture. As a part of a major redistribution before the 1950 election, his seat, North-East Fremantle, was abolished. Tonkin ran for the newly formed seat of Melville, which he won.

Tonkin was made Deputy Premier on 23 February 1953 as part of the Cabinet of Albert Hawke. He regained his role as Minister for Education, and was also appointed Minister for Works and Minister for Water Supplies. In April 1956, he was stripped of his education portfolio in favour of Bill Hegney, as part of a cabinet reshuffle. The Labor Party lost government at the 1959 state election. After Labor, again under Hawke, lost both the 1962 and 1965 elections, Tonkin was elected Leader of the Opposition in January 1967. His party lost the 1968 election, but gained two seats. His wife, Rosalie, died in 1969 of cancer. He married his second wife, Joan West, in Wesley Church, Perth, on 13 June 1971, with a reception being held at Perth Airport.

Tonkin gained power at the 1971 state election, narrowly defeating the coalition led by Sir David Brand. Tonkin was in a rather shaky position.  Labor had only won government by one seat in the Western Australian Legislative Assembly. Owing to a severe malapportionment that over-represented rural areas, Tonkin had to contend with a legislative council in which Labor was outnumbered by almost 2-to-1. He was also not helped by the unpopularity of the Whitlam federal Labor government. As a result, despite gaining a modest swing in the Perth area, Labor lost its majority in the 1974 state election. Although the Liberals came up two seats short of a majority in that election, the balance of power was held by the National Alliance, a merger between the WA branches of the Country and Democratic Labor parties.  Liberal leader Charles Court quickly formed a coalition with the National Alliance, forcing Tonkin to resign.  He was thus one of the few state premiers to have been turned out of office after only one term. He stayed on after the election as State parliamentary leader of the ALP, forming a shadow ministry, until his retirement in 1976, when Colin Jamieson succeeded him as Labor leader.

After his first wife and daughter died of cancer, Tonkin campaigned for many years for radio-wave therapy treatments for cancer sufferers; and he set up a treatment clinic run by cancer surgeon John Holt in Sir Charles Gairdner Hospital. At the time he became Premier and married his second wife in the early 1970s, he was already renowned for his tireless support of the Tronado anti-cancer machine.

In the Queen's Birthday Honours of 1977, John Tonkin was appointed a Companion of the Order of Australia. He died in Perth in 1995, at the age of 93.

Legacy
 In 1985, the Beechboro–Gosnells Highway was renamed the Tonkin Highway after the completion of Stage Four, which linked Hardey Road and the Great Eastern Highway. Tonkin Bridge, which carries the highway over the Swan River, was named for him after his death in 1995.
 In November 2011, Mandurah High School and Mandurah Senior College, both in Mandurah, were amalgamated to form John Tonkin College, named to "honour a West Australian leader in education".
 John Tonkin Reserve, on the Swan River foreshore in East Fremantle, is named for Tonkin.
 Tonkin's former house at 174 Preston Point Road, East Fremantle, a single-storey California bungalow constructed in 1940, is listed on the Municipal Inventory of the Heritage Council of Western Australia as a "Historic Site". Although listed the house was still demolished in 2004.

See also
 Tonkin Ministry
 Tonkin Shadow Ministry

References

|-

1902 births
1995 deaths
Australian people of Cornish descent
Australian schoolteachers
Companions of the Order of Australia
Deputy Premiers of Western Australia
East Fremantle Football Club administrators
Leaders of the Opposition in Western Australia
Members of the Western Australian Legislative Assembly
People from Boulder, Western Australia
Premiers of Western Australia
Treasurers of Western Australia
Australian Labor Party members of the Parliament of Western Australia
20th-century Australian politicians